The Grand Soho Makati is a skyscraper for residential uses completed June 2010 in Makati, Philippines. It is estimated to rise 41 floors above ground. The construction of Grand Soho Makati (GSM), the residential condominium of top real estate developer Century Properties in prime Salcedo Village, has reached full completion in June. 

Positioned as the first fully fitted and fully furnished condominium in the country with three interior design options, GSM is now undergoing going project turnover and has reached a total of 210 accepted units aproject as of July 30. Forty-six percent, or 168 out of a total of 360 residential unit owners, have moved into the building while the remaining 192 are still going through the turnover process. 

An additional six units are allocated for commercial spaces at the ground floor. The 41-storey residential building comes with high-speed elevators, a Travertine stone-clad lobby, and concierge services.

References

See also
List of tallest buildings in Metro Manila

Skyscrapers in Makati
Residential skyscrapers in Metro Manila